The following is a description of Jackie Evancho's concert tours, not including Evancho's joint concerts with other artists (aside from the AGT Live Tour). This article also does not list filmings for Evancho's television appearances (although it mentions her PBS specials in the narrative text) or include any information about her charity and festival concerts and private appearances.  The most noteworthy of Evancho's concerts not listed here are mentioned in her main Wikipedia article.

After her 2nd-place finish in the 5th season of America's Got Talent in 2010, Evancho participated in the America's Got Talent: Live Tour. Beginning in 2011, she headlined solo concert tours to promote each of her albums.

America's Got Talent: Live Tour

The America's Got Talent: Live Tour was the official tour to promote the finalists of the fifth season of America's Got Talent.  Evancho was the first runner-up in that competition, finishing second to singer Michael Grimm. The tour began on October 1, 2010, and ended on November 7, 2010, with shows in 25 cities; Evancho sang in 10 of them.

Evancho performed songs in both the first half and second half of each show in which she participated, and bantered with host Jerry Springer.  A review of the first tour stop that Evancho participated in, on October 1, 2010 in Oakland, California, noted: "She has the gift to carry a note so nicely and so gracefully."

Tour dates

Dream With Me Tour

The Dream With Me Tour, Evancho's first solo tour, promoted her album Dream with Me. It consisted of a series of performances at indoor and outdoor concert venues with symphony orchestras; most of the 2011 concerts were conducted by Constantine Kitsopoulos. Unofficially, the tour began on February 18, 2011, when Evancho performed most of the songs that would be included in Dream With Me in Houston, Texas, with the Houston Chamber Choir. On March 12, she sang these songs at the 2011 Festival of the Arts Boca. Evancho filmed a solo concert television special for the PBS Great Performances series that included nearly the same songs as the CD and first aired in June 2011 on PBS stations and later released on DVD, titled Dream With Me In Concert.  The program was hosted by the album's producer, David Foster. It was the most frequently broadcast of the Great Performances series in 2011, and Evancho was the youngest soloist ever on the series.

At each tour stop, Evancho sang generally 11 songs from Dream With Me after a brief rehearsal with a local orchestra on the day of each performance. The official tour began with the Sun Valley Orchestra on July 31, 2011, where one critic wrote: "If you've ever wondered what an angel sounds like, you got your answer Sunday evening ... pure, joyous, unaffected notes". This was followed by performances in Atlanta, at the Ravinia Festival (with Conrad Tao as pianist), in Omaha, Dallas, and with her hometown Pittsburgh Opera on October 16, 2011.  Conductor Antony Walker took the opportunity to introduce her fans to the Pittsburgh Opera's chorus and soloists, who performed several numbers from Verdi, Bizet and Puccini along with Evancho's repertoire. Evancho made her New York City solo concert debut at Avery Fisher Hall in Lincoln Center on November 7, 2011. The tour was then interrupted by three concerts, described below, to promote Evancho's album Heavenly Christmas.  The last appearance in 2011 was in Las Vegas on December 29, 2011, where Evancho headlined a concert with David Foster and Kenny G, featuring mostly songs from Dream With Me, but also a few Christmas songs.

After a solo concert in Tokyo on January 13, 2012 at the Bunkamura concert hall with the Tokyo Philharmonic Orchestra, featuring songs mostly from Dream With Me, Evancho resumed her Dream With Me Tour in the US on January 28, 2012 at the Fantasy Springs Resort Casino, in California. Beginning with this appearance, Evancho's solo concert performances were conducted by John Mario  and her duet partner was tenor Josh Page, who sang two or three solos to help break up Evancho's set and duetted with her in "The Prayer". During the tour, she generally travelled with her mother and sister Juliet. The next six tour stops were in California and Utah. The young soloist's contract with Fresno Grand Opera contained the unusual requirement that the Saroyan Theatre "provide colored pencils in her dressing room." Evancho's three February tour stops were ranked the tenth top-grossing tour by Billboard for the relevant week. In June 2012, she concluded the tour with performances in Alpharetta, Georgia and Newark, New Jersey, with the New Jersey Symphony Orchestra.

Reaction
In reviewing her Pittsburgh Opera concert, the Pittsburgh Tribune-Review called her voice "beautifully in tune and well supported. ... Evancho's sincerity of delivery was affecting". A reviewer from The New York Times wrote of her 2011 Avery Fisher Hall concert that "In the first half of the show Ms. Evancho often receded, but toward the end of the night she found purpose, delivering 'A Time for Us' with punch, and closing out Sarah McLachlan's 'Angel' with what felt like real yearning, while the orchestra mostly stayed out of her way."

In an interview prior to their joint Las Vegas concert in December 2011, David Foster said of Evancho: "People just love her. She's carrying the whole show herself, she's so professional. ... I don’t want to say I’m riding her coattails, but she's very comfortable doing it on her own. ... I’ve never seen anything like it ever. ... She's phenomenal."  Robin Leach, writing for the Las Vegas Sun, commented on that concert: "Jackie was beyond brilliant!"  A San Francisco Chronicle review of Evancho's 2012 concert in San Francisco judged her singing "an impressive thing to witness, and Evancho's technical precision and enormous range only serve to make it seem less fluky. The girl can sing"; but the reviewer felt that "every selection sounded alike".

Tour dates

§ Indicates that the orchestra was specially arranged for this concert.

Selected box office data

Heavenly Christmas concerts

To promote her 2011 Christmas album, Heavenly Christmas, Evancho gave three concerts, each with a locally arranged orchestra:
Buffalo, New York, December 15, 2011 – Shea's Performing Arts Center
Atlantic City, New Jersey, December 17, 2011 – Etess Arena
Pittsburgh, Pennsylvania, December 20, 2011 – Benedum Center

Evancho sang 14 songs in each of these appearances, including songs from her three most recent albums, mixing Christmas music with her classical crossover repertoire. On this mini-tour, 20-year-old Canadian tenor Christopher Dallo, who had beaten her in the 2009 David Foster talent search contest, sang three solos to break up Evancho's sets, and duetted with her in "The Prayer".

Evancho also included a few songs from Heavenly Christmas in her December 29, 2011 Las Vegas concert with David Foster, her Tokyo, Japan concert on January 13, 2012 and in her December 2012 concerts.

Selected box office data

Songs from the Silver Screen Tour

Evancho's two-year tour to promote her album Songs from the Silver Screen began on August 19, 2012, at Bunkamura Orchard Hall, near Tokyo, Japan, with the Tokyo Philharmonic Orchestra. Jacob Evancho (now known as Juliet) duetted with her there on the song "I See the Light". On August 25, 2012, she continued the tour with stops in 23 cities in the US and Canada, starting with a performance in Philadelphia, Pennsylvania, at the Mann Center with The Chamber Orchestra of Philadelphia. Other appearances followed in Arizona, Colorado, Texas, California, Georgia, Florida, Minnesota, Illinois, Massachusetts New Jersey, Pennsylvania, Canada, Nevada, Rhode Island, Maryland, Florida and Ohio, ending in Lewiston, New York in June 2013.

A second leg of the tour included a dozen stops from October 2013 to January 2014, three additional performances from April to June 2014 and three more in August 2014. It began with a stop in Massachusetts, followed by eight stops in California, Oregon and Washington, two concerts in Florida and one in Arizona. The next three concerts were in Michigan, Wisconsin and Indiana, and the last three stops were in the northeastern US.

At each tour stop, Evancho sang generally 13 songs, mostly from Songs from the Silver Screen, mixed with songs from her earlier recordings, particularly Dream With Me. As with previous tours, she usually rehearsed briefly with the local orchestra on the day of each performance. In the first leg of the tour, trumpeter Jumaane Smith, who appeared with Evancho in her 2012 PBS special, Music of the Movies, accompanied her in "The Summer Knows", from Summer of 42, and played two solos to break up her sets. In the second leg of the tour, Evancho had no duet partner, and breaks were provided by orchestra selections. The conductor for both legs of the tour was John Mario Di Costanzo. Evancho's mother accompanied her on the tour.

Evancho's second PBS Great Performances concert special, called Jackie Evancho: Music of the Movies, began to air on PBS stations in August 2012, before the tour began. The special features nearly the same selections as Songs from the Silver Screen. A DVD version of the program was distributed as a pledge gift by PBS and was included as part of the deluxe set of Songs from the Silver Screen from Target stores. A TV Worth Watching reviewer stated, "From a Willy Wonka number ('Pure Imagination'), to Phantom of the Opera almost-epic 'Music of the Night,' the young singer has it all under control." The special continued to be broadcast by PBS stations in 2013.

Reaction

A reviewer at Evancho's Denver concert noted the audience's enthusiasm and wrote that she "displayed her famous combo of poise and articulation". But he noted "the burden of being a kid soprano, a true phenomenon. People pay a lot to see you and orchestras line up to get you on their stage. But still folks wonder if you really comprehend your life; if you shouldn’t be home ... eating ice cream instead of in Denver. ... And yet they rise to their feet, yet again, as you finish." The reviewer for Naples Daily News gave Evancho an unqualified rave: "Her poise. Her control. Her range. ... Her voice and her performance exhausted all of the superlatives in the dictionary." At her Baltimore stop: "Her pure and well-formed vowel sounds touched the hearts of everyone at the concert. Every year her voice seems to get better and better. Evancho clearly wished upon a star and asked for a beautiful singing voice." She "got a standing ovation at Miami's Adrienne Arsht Center for the Performing Arts, where she displayed her stunningly mature vocal power, phrasing and range."

Tour dates

§ Indicates that the orchestra was specially arranged for this concert.

Awakening Tour

Evancho's concert tour to promote her album Awakening began in November 2014. Before the tour began, Evancho filmed her third PBS concert special at Longwood Gardens in Pennsylvania before a live audience, which included all of the songs from Awakening. The special began airing on PBS stations in November 2014. For this tour, at most venues, Evancho useds pre-recorded accompaniment enhanced by approximately a dozen live musicians, normally led from the piano by music director Peter Kiesewalter. At some of the tour stops, as noted below, musicians from existing orchestras were used, while at most venues, the musicians were locally assembled. On this tour, Evancho's father traveled with her more often than her mother.

The tour began with stops in New Jersey and Costa Rica in late 2014. In 2015, stops were in California, Arizona, Nevada, Pennsylvania, Georgia, South Carolina, Florida, Virginia, Tennessee, Connecticut, Maryland, Oregon, Massachusetts, Indiana, Kentucky, Colorado, Michigan and Ontario, Canada. The first two stops in 2016 were in Florida, with another concert in Texas and the last one in New Jersey in April 2016. The concert selections "feature[d] the lush classical-crossover compositions for which [Evancho] has become known, as well as the more contemporary material" on Awakening. Robin Leach reviewed Evancho's January 2015 concert in Las Vegas, writing: "She's still got the voice of an angel. It's remarkable, and her power is growing as she grows up. [She] had the audience on its feet with wild applause at the end of every song … from her new and past albums." Evancho received further warm reviews on the tour.

Tour dates

§On this tour, Evancho usually appeared with her orchestra leader, Peter Kiesewalter, at the piano, and a dozen locally assembled string players who added to pre-recorded backing tracks. Where an orchestra is named, members of that orchestra were used. In Pittsburgh, Nashville, Denver and Kalamazoo, larger ensembles with other conductors were used.

Live in Concert Tour (2016–2017)

Evancho gave a US concert tour from October 2016 to March 2017. Stops in 2016 included venues in Illinois, Indiana, Ohio, South Carolina (with special guest Chris Mann), New Jersey, New York, Rhode Island, Kentucky and Florida. Stops in 2017 included venues in Texas, California, Florida, Pennsylvania and Washington. Evancho promoted the tour with a YouTube video released in September 2016.

At the first concerts of the tour, Evancho performed a mix of songs from her earlier albums, songs she had recently released as singles (some which appear on her 2017 album Two Hearts), and covers of standards. At the concerts closer to Christmas, in addition to those selections, she included several holiday songs, including some from her 2016 holiday album Someday at Christmas. Later concerts in this tour included additional songs from Two Hearts.

Reviewing her holiday show in Troy, New York, Steve Barnes of the Times Union noted that Evancho performed more than 20 numbers, including four holiday songs. He wrote that her voice is "an instrument of pristine beauty. It peals with the purity of bells and lofts tones that shimmer with celestial iridescence" but that her performance lacks "an apparent interpretive style or emotional connection to the material". Kirk Stauffer wrote for Back Beat Seattle that, at The Triple Door, Evancho "had a mature stage presence and shared personal experiences between songs. ... The evening ended with a well-deserved standing ovation.

Tour dates

§ Evancho was accompanied by Kiesewalter at the piano and synthesizer, and pre-recorded backing tracks.
°Evancho was accompanied by Kiesewalter at the piano and synthesizer, pre-recorded backing tracks and several live string players.

Two Hearts tour (2017–2019)

Evancho gave this nationwide concert tour to promote her seventh studio album Two Hearts. Her 2016 holiday album, Someday at Christmas, was Evancho's last commitment to Sony, but after her January 2017 performance of the US national anthem at the presidential inauguration of Donald Trump, she experienced a bump in her album sales. She received new offers from several labels and soon signed a new record deal with Sony, after which she released Two Hearts, on March 31, 2017, on Sony's Portrait label. The album includes a classical crossover disc and an EP disc of five pop songs, four of which Evancho co-wrote. The release was Evancho's first that included her own songwriting (other than her contribution in 2010 to the lyrics of the title song of Dream With Me). Fanai and Holley returned as producers and co-writers, with Evancho, of the four songs on the EP.

Evancho sang a few of the songs from Two Hearts towards the end of her 2016–2017 Live in Concert Tour. In March 2017, Evancho released a music video of one of the songs from the album, "Attesa". In April, she began television promotions for the album with a performance on the Today Show, appearances on NBC's New York Live and ABC's The View, and ten performances at Café Carlyle in New York City, where she was the youngest artist ever to ever perform at the venue. The same month, she released a music video of another song from the album, "Pedestal".

On May 19, 2017, Evancho began a US tour to promote Two Hearts. The tour had stops in Illinois, Indiana, Michigan, California, Texas, Pennsylvania and Maryland in 2017. The tour resumed in 2018 with stops in California, Ohio, Washington, Oregon, Idaho, New Jersey and Pennsylvania. Kiesewalter continued as her musical director. Evancho's set list for the tour included songs from Two Hearts ("The Way We Were", "May It Be", "Caruso", "Safe & Sound", "Pedestal" and "How Great Thou Art"), together with songs from her previous albums, and a few songs that she has sung in previous concerts but had not yet included in her albums. As in previous years, Evancho also included Christmas songs in the set list of her November and December concerts. She made stops in Arizona, California, Texas, Massachusetts, New Jersey, Pennsylvania, Florida and Illinois at the end of the tour in early 2019.

Tour dates

§Evancho was accompanied by Kiesewalter at the piano and synthesizer, pre-recorded backing tracks and several live string players.
°Evancho was accompanied by Kiesewalter at the piano and synthesizer, and pre-recorded backing tracks.

The Debut tour (2019–2022)

In April 2019, Evancho released her eighth studio album, The Debut. The album includes songs from Broadway shows and movies mostly of the 21st century. Evancho began to include some of the songs from The Debut towards the end of her 2017–2019 Two Hearts Tour.

On April 23, 2019, Evancho began a US tour to promote The Debut with a concert at Feinstein's/54 Below in New York City. The tour continued in 2019 and early 2020, with stops in Pennsylvania, New York, California, Nevada, Ohio, Indiana, New Jersey, Massachusetts, Utah and Colorado. Concerts scheduled after February 2020 were cancelled due to the COVID-19 pandemic. 

The tour resumed in 2022 with stops in California, Florida and New Jersey. Evancho also promoted the album on various media, including Yahoo! Finance and Good Morning America, often singing "Burn" from Hamilton. On this tour, except as noted below, Evancho was accompanied by a small ensemble led from the piano by music director Jorn Swart. A reviewer for New Jersey Stage wrote of her December 13, 2019 concert, that "Evancho sings with feeling. [Her] voice floats out over the audience … with precision and grace, her runs and tone spot on".

Tour dates

References

External links
Evancho's official tour page (click on Past Dates)
Evancho and Josh Page sing "The Prayer" on tour (2012)
Awakening PBS special promo (2014)
Live in Concert Tour promo (2016)

Lists of concert tours